Sascha Gueymard Wayenburg (born 1 August 2003) is a French tennis player.

Gueymard Wayenburg has a career high ATP singles ranking of No. 427 achieved on 26 September 2022. He also has a career high ATP doubles ranking of No. 466 achieved on 9 May 2022. Gueymard Wayenburg has won one ITF singles tournament and one ITF doubles tournament.

Gueymard Wayenburg made his ATP main draw debut at the 2022 Open Sud de France after receiving a wildcard into the doubles main draw with Luca Van Assche.

He made his Grand Slam debut in doubles at the 2022 French Open as a wildcard pair partnering also Van Assche.

Challenger and World Tennis Tour Finals

Singles: 3 (1-2)

References

External links

2003 births
Living people
French male tennis players
Sportspeople from Aix-en-Provence